Bernard Cracroft Aston  (9 August 1871 – 31 May 1951), also known as Barney Aston, was New Zealand's first official agricultural chemist and was also a notable botanist. He was born in Beckenham, Kent, England, on 9 August 1871. He was a member of the 1907 Sub-Antarctic Islands Scientific Expedition. He was appointed a Commander of the Order of the British Empire in the 1949 New Year Honours for services to agriculture and botany.

References

1871 births
1951 deaths
20th-century New Zealand chemists
20th-century New Zealand botanists
English emigrants to New Zealand
Presidents of the Royal Society of New Zealand
New Zealand Commanders of the Order of the British Empire